Poland has a rich selection of gold and silver commemorative coins. In the year 2005 coins were launched in the series: "Polish Kings and Princes", "Animals of the World", "History of the Polish Zloty" and "Polish Painters of the Turn of 19th and 20th Centuries" and various occasional coins.

Table of contents

See also

 Numismatics
 Regular issue coinage
 Coin grading

References

Commemorative coins of Poland